Oreoschimperella is a genus of flowering plants in the umbellifer family Apiaceae, native to Kenya, Ethiopia, and the Arabian Peninsula. Poorly studied, they are closely related to Trachyspermum.

The genus name of Oreoschimperella is in honour of Georg Wilhelm Schimper (1804–1878), a German botanist and naturalist.

Species
Currently accepted species include:

Oreoschimperella aberdarensis (C.Norman) Rauschert
Oreoschimperella arabiae-felicis (C.C.Towns.) C.C.Towns.
Oreoschimperella verrucosa (J.Gay ex A.Rich.) Rauschert

References 

Apiaceae
Apiaceae genera